The New Democratic Party of Manitoba leadership election of 2017 was called as a result of the resignation of Manitoba NDP leader Greg Selinger following his government's defeat in the April 19, 2016, Manitoba general election.

Rules
The rules and format of the leadership election were decided by the party in March 2017 where no major changes to the status quo were approved. The party decided in favour of holding a traditional delegated leadership convention rather than a One Member One Vote election. In the 2015 race, labour unions had been allotted 31 per cent of delegate slots.

Timeline
April 19, 2016 - General election. Selinger's NDP government is defeated; Selinger announces his intention to resign as party leader.
May 7, 2016 - Flor Marcelino (Logan) is named interim leader of the NDP and Leader of the Opposition in the Legislative Assembly of Manitoba. 
September 21, 2016 - Kevin Chief, a former senior minister in Selinger's cabinet who was widely seen as his likely successor, announces he will not be a candidate for the leadership. He subsequently announced his resignation as an MLA, effective January 9, 2017.
June 12, 2016 - NDP Provincial Council decides that the leadership election will be held by October 2017.
December 11, 2016 - NDP Provincial Council decides that the election be held in mid-September 2017 and recommends a series of rule changes such as a leadership review process, that one of two systems be used for electing the leader: The first would allow every party member to vote, with a minimum number of votes guaranteed to smaller constituencies and unions. The second would use a delegate system that would include more flexibility and representation for unions. Recommendations are to be voted upon at the annual NDP convention in March.
March 17–19, 2017 - NDP annual convention to meet at the Indian & Metis Friendship Centre in Winnipeg. The convention decided to have a traditional delegated leadership convention rather than have a One Member One Vote election. 
April 10, 2017 - Wab Kinew declares his candidacy.
June 18, 2017, 4:30 PM - Deadline to become a new member or renew membership of the party and be able to vote for delegates to the convention, or be a delegate.
June 28, 2017 - Steve Ashton declares his candidacy.
July 15, 2017 - Nomination deadline
July 18, 2017, 7 PM - Leadership forum at Riverbank Discovery Centre, Brandon, Manitoba
July 20, 2017, 7:30 PM - Leadership forum at Gimli Recreation Centre, Gimli, Manitoba
July 24, 2017, 7 PM - Leadership forum at Vale Community Centre Gymnasium, Thompson, Manitoba
July 26, 2017, 7 PM - Leadership forum at Richardson College for the Environment and Science Complex, University of Winnipeg
July 31, 2017 - Deadline to apply to stand to be a delegate.
August 8, 2017, 9:30 AM - Online voting to elect delegates begins.
August 21, 2017, 4:30 PM - Online voting to elect delegates ends.
September 16, 2017 - Leadership election to be held. Call to order at noon (Central Time), voting begins at 1:40 PM. Wab Kinew declared elected at 3:28 PM.

Candidates

Steve Ashton

Background
Steve Ashton, former MLA for Thompson (1981–2016), Minister of Infrastructure and Transportation and Minister responsible for Emergency Measures (2015–2016), Minister of Infrastructure and Transportation (2009–2014), Minister of Intergovernmental Affairs (2006–2009), Minister of Water Stewardship (2003–2006), Minister of Labour and Immigration (2003), Minister of Conservation (2002–2003), Minister of Transportation and Government Services (2001–2002), Minister of Highways and Government Services (1999–2001). Runner-up in the 2009 leadership election and third place candidate in the 2015 leadership election. Father of federal NDP MP Niki Ashton.
Date campaign launched: June 28, 2017.
Campaign website: https://web.archive.org/web/20180203183206/https://steveashtonndp.ca/ 
Supporters
MLAs: (5) Flor Marcelino (Wellington, 2007–2011, and Logan, 2011–2019), interim leader (2016—2017); Ted Marcelino (Tyndall Park, 2011–2019); Jim Maloway (Elmwood, 1986–2008 and 2011–present, and MP for Elmwood—Transcona 2008–2011) Amanda Lathlin (The Pas, 2015–present), Tom Lindsey (Flin Flon, 2016–present)
MPs:  
Municipal politicians: Winnipeg City Councillor Jason Schreyer
Former MLAs: 
Former MPs:
Other prominent individuals:  
Trade Unions and other organizations:
Other information
Vows to reinvest in community hospitals
Promises to rebuild the Manitoba NDP in rural Manitoba
Would raise the minimum wage to $15 an hour in the first year of an NDP mandate. 
Would lower university tuition fees.

Wab Kinew

Background
Wab Kinew, is the MLA for Fort Rouge (2016–present), former broadcaster, musician, author, and professor.
Date campaign launched: April 10, 2017.
Campaign website: https://www.wabkinew.ca/
Supporters
MLAs: (5) James Allum (Fort Garry-Riverview, 2011–2019), Minister of Justice and Attorney General (2014-2016), Minister of Education and Advanced Learning (2013-2014); Nahanni Fontaine (St. Johns, 2016–present); Bernadette Smith (Point Douglas, 2017–present); Andrew Swan (Minto, 2004–2019) Government House Leader (2013-2014), Minister of Justice and Attorney General (2009-2014), Minister of Competitiveness, Training and Trade (2008-2009); Matt Wiebe (Concordia, 2010–present);
MPs: (1) Daniel Blaikie (Elmwood-Transcona, 2015–present)
Municipal politicians: (3) Lonnie Patterson, Brandon Town Councillor; Arlene Reid, Winnipeg School Division Trustee; Sherri Rollins, Chair of the Winnipeg School Division Board of Trustees
Former MLAs: (8) Nancy Allan (St. Vital, 1999-2016), Minister of Education (2009-2013), Minister of Labour and Immigration (2003-2009); Becky Barrett (Inkster/Wellington, 1990-2003) Minister responsible for the Civil Service and Minister of Labour, (1999-2003); Eugene Kostyra (Seven Oaks, 1981-1988) Finance Minister (1986-1988); Ron Lemieux (Dawson Trail/La Verendrye, 1999-2016); Jim Rondeau (Assiniboia, 1999-2016), Minister of Healthy Living and Seniors (2009-2013), Minister of Science, Energy, Technology and Mines (2006-2009), Minister of Industry, Economic Development and Mines (2004-2006); Tim Sale (Fort Rouge/Crescentwood, 1995-2007), Minister of Health (2004-2006), Minister of Energy, Science and Technology, Family Services and Housing (2002-2004); Harry Schellenberg (Rossmere, 1993-1995, 1999-2007); Vic Schroeder (Rossmere, 1979-1988), Attorney General (1987-1988), Minister of Finance (1981-1986); Muriel Smith (Osborne, 1981-1988), Deputy Premier (1981-1988)
Former MPs: (3) Bill Blaikie (Elmwood-Transcona, 1979-2008); Pat Martin (Winnipeg Center, 1997-2015); Judy Wasylycia-Leis (Winnipeg North/Winnipeg North Centre, 1997-2010), (MLA St. John's, 1986-1993), Minister of Culture, Heritage and Recreation (1986-1988)
Other prominent individuals: (4) Gord Delbridge, Regional Vice-President - Manitoba, Canadian Union of Public Employees; Stephen Lewis, former United Nations Special Envoy for HIV/AIDS in Africa (2001-2006), Canadian Ambassador to the United Nations (1984-1988), and leader of the Ontario New Democratic Party (1970-1978); Michelle McHale, withdrawn leadership contestant; Jagmeet Singh, Ontario MPP for Bramalea—Gore—Malton and 2017 federal NDP leadership candidate
Trade Unions and other organizations: (4) Manitoba Federation of Labour; Amalgamated Transit Union Local 1505; Canadian Union of Public Employees - Manitoba; International Brotherhood of Electrical Workers Local 2085
Other information
Promises to increase minimum wage to $15 an hour incrementally by 2024.
Will target an NDP caucus of 50% women, transgender, and non-binary-gender people. Has named an advisory council to assist in reaching this goal.
Would implement universal pharmacare.
Vows to invest more in recreation and active living facilities.

Withdrawn

Michelle McHale
Background
Michelle McHale, is a staff representative for the United Food and Commercial Workers union and social activist. She gained national prominence for organizing a pride parade in Steinbach, Manitoba, a conservative town in the province's Bible Belt.
Date campaign launched: March 10, 2017
Date campaign ended: April 22, 2017
Subsequently endorsed: Wab Kinew

Declined
 James Allum, MLA for Fort Garry-Riverview (2011–2019), former Minister of Justice and Attorney General (2014–2016).  Endorsed Kinew.
 Niki Ashton, MP for Churchill—Keewatinook Aski (2015–present) and Churchill (2008–2015). Placed seventh in the 2012 federal NDP leadership race.
 Rebecca Blaikie, former president of the New Democratic Party of Canada (2011-2016)
 Kevin Chief, MLA for Point Douglas (2011–2016), Minister of Jobs and the Economy (2014–2016), Minister of Children and Youth Opportunities (2012–2014) announced in September 2016 that he will not be a candidate and then announced in December 2016 that he is resigning his seat in the legislature.
 Nahanni Fontaine, MLA for St. Johns (2016–present) Endorsed Kinew.
 Brian Mayes, Winnipeg City Councillor (2011–present) and a member of the city's executive committee, was considered a possible candidate but announced that he intends to remain at city hall.
 Theresa Oswald, runner-up in 2015 leadership election, former MLA for Seine River (2003–2016), Minister of Jobs and the Economy (2013–2014), Minister of Health (2006–2013), Minister of Healthy Living (2004–2006).
 Andrew Swan, MLA for Minto (2004–2019), former cabinet minister under Doer and Selinger.  Said in April 2017 that he was considering a run but later endorsed Kinew.
 Matt Wiebe, MLA for Concordia (2010–present); Endorsed Kinew.

Results

References

 

2017 elections in Canada
2017 in Manitoba
2017
Manitoba New Democratic Party leadership election